The most fundamental item of study in modern algebraic geometry is the category of schemes.  This category admits many different Grothendieck topologies, each of which is well-suited for a different purpose.  This is a list of some of the topologies on the category of schemes.

 cdh topology A variation of the h topology
 Étale topology Uses etale morphisms. 
 fppf topology Faithfully flat of finite presentation
 fpqc topology Faithfully flat quasicompact
 h topology  Coverings are universal topological epimorphisms

 v-topology (also called universally subtrusive topology): coverings are maps which admit liftings for extensions of valuation rings
 l′ topology A variation of the Nisnevich topology
 Nisnevich topology Uses etale morphisms, but has an extra condition about isomorphisms between residue fields. 
 qfh topology Similar to the h topology with a quasifiniteness condition. 
 Zariski topology Essentially equivalent to the "ordinary" Zariski topology.
 Smooth topology Uses smooth morphisms, but is usually equivalent to the etale topology (at least for schemes).
 Canonical topology The finest such that all representable functors are sheaves.

See also

References 

 Belmans, Pieter. Grothendieck topologies and étale cohomology
 

Algebraic geometry